Villa Clara won its third straight Cuban National Series title during the 1994-95 season.

Standings

Group A

Group B

Group C

Group D

Playoffs

References

 (Note - text is printed in a white font on a white background, depending on browser used.)

Cuban National Series seasons
Base
Base
Cuba
Cuba